Nikolay Makarov may refer to:
Nikolay Makarov (firearms designer) (1914–1988), Soviet firearms designer
Nikolay Georgievich Makarov (born 1955), Russian mathematician
Nikolay Mikhaylovich Makarov (born 1948), Soviet ice hockey player
Nikolay Yegorovich Makarov (born 1949), Russian general and Chief of the General Staff